Paraphasmophaga is a genus of flies in the family Tachinidae.

Species
P. clavis Townsend, 1915
P. dissita Reinhard, 1962

References

Exoristinae
Diptera of North America
Tachinidae genera
Taxa named by Charles Henry Tyler Townsend